

234001–234100 

|-id=026
| 234026 Unioneastrofili ||  || The Italian Amateur Astronomers Union (UAI). It was founded in 1967, and counts over 1000 members and releases the peer-reviewed magazine Astronomia. The UAI has many research sections and undertakes scientific popularization and didactics, with the co-operation of the Ministry of Education and Universities. || 
|}

234101–234200 

|-bgcolor=#f2f2f2
| colspan=4 align=center | 
|}

234201–234300 

|-id=292
| 234292 Wolfganghansch ||  || Wolfgang Hansch (born 1954), a German geologist, editor and lecturer, who is the founder and managing director of the science center experimenta gGmbH in Heilbronn, Germany. || 
|-id=294
| 234294 Pappsándor ||  || Sándor Papp (born 1949) is a Hungarian amateur astronomer, who has made more than 100,000 visual brightness estimation of variable stars. || 
|}

234301–234400 

|-bgcolor=#f2f2f2
| colspan=4 align=center | 
|}

234401–234500 

|-bgcolor=#f2f2f2
| colspan=4 align=center | 
|}

234501–234600 

|-bgcolor=#f2f2f2
| colspan=4 align=center | 
|}

234601–234700 

|-bgcolor=#f2f2f2
| colspan=4 align=center | 
|}

234701–234800 

|-id=750
| 234750 Amymainzer ||  || Amy Mainzer (born 1974) is an American astronomer and member of the Wide-field Infrared Survey Explorer (WISE) team. She was the principal investigator of a project to enhance WISE's ability to find new minor planets. The name was suggested by H. Bill. || 
|-id=761
| 234761 Rainerkracht ||  || Rainer Kracht (born 1948), is a German amateur astronomer who discovered more than two hundred comets on images taken by the SOHO spacecraft. The Kracht group comets are named after him. Kracht is also a discoverer of minor planets. The name was suggested by H. Bill. || 
|}

234801–234900 

|-bgcolor=#f2f2f2
| colspan=4 align=center | 
|}

234901–235000 

|-bgcolor=#f2f2f2
| colspan=4 align=center | 
|}

References 

234001-235000